Pratapgarh State, also known as 'Partabgarh', was one of the princely states of India during the period of the British Raj. The state was founded in 1425 as Kanthal state and was later renamed after its capital located in Pratapgarh, Rajasthan.

Pratapgarh was a 15 gun salute princely state; its last ruler signed the accession to the Indian Union on 7 April 1949.

History
Maharana Kumbha ruled Chittorgarh in the 14th century. Due to a dispute with his younger brother Kshemkarn he expelled him from his territory. Kshemkarn's family was refugee for some time and lived in the Aravalli Range in the southern area of Rajasthan. In 1425 Kanthal state was founded. In 1514 Rajkumar Surajmal became the ruler of Devgarh, and this raj later came to be known as Pratapgarh raj. As the environment of Devgarh was not found to be suitable by the royal family, one of the descendants of Raja Surajmal, Rajkumar Pratap Singh started to build a new town near Devgarh in 1698 and named it Pratapgarh.

Rulers
They had the right to a 15 gun salute.

Maharawat
1775 – 1844: Sawant Singh
1844 – 1864: Dalpat Singh
1864 – 15 Feb 1890: Udai Singh
1890 – 18 Jan 1929: Raghunath Singh (b. 1857 – d. 1929)
1929 – 15 Aug 1947: Ram Singh (b. 1908 – d. 1949)

See also
List of Rajput dynasties and states
Mewar Residency
Rajputana Agency

References

External links

Princely states of Rajasthan
15th-century establishments in India
1425 establishments in Asia
1949 disestablishments in India
Rajputs
Pratapgarh district, Rajasthan